Rabilal Tudu is an Indian writer of Santali language and banker from West Bengal. He won Sahitya Akademi Award in 2015.

Biography
Tudu was born on 1949 in Bardhaman, West Bengal. He wrote plays for stage and radio.

Tudu was awarded Sahitya Akademi Award in 2015 for his play Parsi Khatir.

References

Living people
1949 births
Recipients of the Sahitya Akademi Award in Santali
Indian bankers
People from Bardhaman
Santali people